Dungaram Rajoria is an Indian politician who represented Dausa in the Rajasthan government. As a member of the SWT political party, Rajoria won election in 1962. However, he failed to find success in the 1980 election.

He was married to Mathra Devi.

References 

20th-century Indian politicians